Central City Opera is the fifth-oldest opera company in the United States, founded in 1932 by Julie Penrose and Anne Evans. Each festival is presented in the 550-seat historic Central City Opera House built in 1878 in the gold mining era town of Central City, Colorado. Pelham G. Pearce was selected in 1996 as Managing Director for Central City Opera, and he was named General/Artistic Director in May 1998, when John Moriarty became Artistic Director Emeritus. Since 2006 John Baril is the first Music director of the opera.

Most recent six-week summer festivals have included both traditional and progressive works.  About forty performances, including those specifically for young people, are presented each season.  2007 marked the 75th anniversary of the company and a single-season move from 3 to 4 opera productions.  "Short Works" (selected ten-minute opera scenes), selected one-acts, and "Lunch & a Song" (solo luncheon performances) are produced alongside the main opera season by assistant directors and apprentice singers as part of the Bonfils-Stanton Foundation Artists Training Program.

Commissions
Successful commissions for the company include the American classic The Ballad of Baby Doe by Douglas Moore, premiered in 1956, the popular one-act opera The Face on the Barroom Floor by Henry Mollicone, premiered in 1978 and the 2003 world premiere of Gabriel's Daughter, also composed by Henry Mollicone. The World Premiere of Chinese opera, Poet Li Bai, commissioned by the Asian Performing Arts of Colorado, was presented in 2007.

Artist training
Central City Opera's prestigious Bonfils-Stanton Foundation Artists Training Program, founded by Artistic Director Emeritus John Moriarty, has served for more than two decades as a national model for training young singers.  The rigorous 10-week program integrates daily training in diction, movement, and stage combat with individual coaching, sessions in career management and rehearsals and performance opportunities in the summer's mainstage and auxiliary productions.  The program selects 30-32 participants from nearly 1,000 applicants each year.

Opera traditions
Noteworthy Opera traditions include the annual presentation of the Central City Flower Girls and the Yellow Rose Ball, Colorado's oldest debutante ceremony, on opening day.

The Ushers Song (sung by the Usher Corps as they march up the street to open the theatre for each mainstage performance).  The Usher Corps, composed of collegiate and young professional interns from all production and administrative departments, includes the traditional Bell Ringer to announce the time.

Lyrics for The Ushers' Song:
Well, what do you know, here we go / we're off to start the show.
You'll know who we are from afar; /frankly we sing better than the star.

We're the ushers, who show to your seat / then nonchalantly, we step upon your feet.
You may have bought a ticket / for Row A and seat 3.
But when we're through with you / you'll find you're in the balcony.

We're the ushers who heed your beck and call / yet when you need us, we're never there at all.
Our flashlights never working to show the pitfalls lurking / We're the ushers of the Central City show!

See also
List of opera festivals

References

External links
Central City Opera website

Opera festivals
American opera companies
Musical groups established in 1932
1932 establishments in Colorado
Performing arts in Colorado